Shape theory refers to three different theories:

 Shape theory in topology
 Shape analysis (disambiguation) in mathematics and computer science
 Shape theory of olfaction